This is a partial list of artworks produced by Pablo Picasso from 1889 to 1900.

1890
Le petit picador jaune (1889–1890), oil on wood, 24 x 19 cm, The Picasso Estate
Pigeons (1890), lead pencil on paper, 11 x 22 cm, Museu Picasso
Course de taureaux et colombes (1890–1892), pencil on paper, 13.5 x 20.2 cm, Museu Picasso
Hercule et sa matraque (1890)

1896
L'enfant de chœur (1896), oil on canvas, 76 x 50 cm, Museu de Montserrat
Portrait de la mère de l'artiste (1896), pastel on paper, 49.8 x 39 cm, Museu Picasso
Autoportrait aux cheveux courts (1896) oil on canvas, 46.5 x 31.5 cm, Museu Picasso
Tête de fille (1896), oil on canvas on paperboard, 29.8 x 26.1 cm, Museu Picasso
Autoportrait mal coiffé (1896)
Portrait du père de l'artiste  (1896), oil on canvas on cardboard, 42.3 x 30.8 cm, Museu Picasso
Tête d'un homme barbu (La Llotja) (1896), oil on canvas, 28.5 x 36 cm, Private Collection
Portrait de la tante Pepa (1896), oil on canvas, 57.5 x 50.5 cm, Museu Picasso
Scène biblique (1896), oil on canvas, 35.5 x 52 cm, Museu Picasso
Autoportrait en gentilhomme du XVIIIe siècle (1896), oil on canvas, 55.8 x 46 cm, Museu Picasso
Nu [Étude] (1896), charcoal and black pencil on paper, 62 x 42.7 cm, Museu Picasso
Courses de taureaux (1896), oil on canvas, 13.7 x 22.1 cm, Museu Picasso
Courses de taureaux (1896), pen and ink on paper, 14.6 x 22.3 cm, Musée Picasso

1897 

 Science and charity (1897), oil on canvas, 197 cm × 249.5 cm, Museu Picasso

1898

Fille bohémienne devant La Musciera (1898), pastel on paper, 44.5 x 59.7 cm, Private Collection
Fille assise (1898)
Portrait de Lola (1898), conte pencil on paper, 32.2 x 24.7 cm, Museu Picasso
Femme à la guitare (1898)
Garçon bohémien nu (1898), oil on canvas, 49.7 x 32 cm
L'aumône (1898)
Portrait de Carmen (1898), conte pencil on paper, 48 x 31.5 cm, Museu Picasso
Autoportrait (1898), conte pencil and color pencil on paper, 17.5 x 10.5 cm, Museu Picasso
Le charnier (1898), conte pencil, sanguine, and watercolor on paper, 10.5 x 17.5 cm, Museu Picasso
Homme lisant (1898), conte pencil and watercolor on paper, 17.5 x 10.5 cm, Museu Picasso
Portrait de Pepe-Illo (1898), conte pencil and color pencil on paper, 17.5 x 10.5 cm, Museu Picasso
Saeta et son maître (1898), conte pencil and watercolor on paper, 17.5 x 10.5 cm, Museu Picasso
Au bord du lit (1898), pencil on paper, 18.5 x 13 cm, Museu Picasso
Trois roses (1898)
Carter (1898)
Tête de cheval (1898)
Cheval (1898), color pencil, 25 x 28 cm, The Picasso Estate
Cheval Attele (1898), charcoal and watercolor on paper, 24.4 x 27.9 cm, Richard Gray Gallery
Lola de profil (1898), conte pencil on paper, Private Collection
Maisons de Horta d'Ebre (1898), pencil on paper, 16 x 20 cm, Museu Picasso
Maisons de Horta d'Ebre (1898), oil on canvas, 27 x 39 cm, Private Collection
Maison dans un champ de blé (1898), oil on canvas, 33 x 44 cm, Museu Picasso
Paysage de Horta d'Ebre (1898)
Hermitage de Saint Antoine du Tossai (1898)
Mulet (1898), oil on canvas, 27.7 x 36.4 cm, Museu Picasso
Chèvres sauvages (1898), conte pencil on paper, 16.1 x 24.8 cm, Museu Picasso
La caverne (1898), oil on wood, 12.8 x 18.1 cm, Museu Picasso
Chèvres (1898), pencil on paper, 32.3 x 24.5 cm, Museu Picasso
Jeune berger (1898), conte pencil on paper, 32.2 x 24.5 cm, Museu Picasso
Mas du Quiquet (1898), oil on canvas, 27 x 40 cm, Museu Picasso
Berger courtisant (1898), conte pencil on paper, 10.8 x 13.3 cm, Museu Picasso
Bûcheron (1898)
Moulin (1898)
Paysan et moulin (1898)
Garçon de Horta d'Ebre (1898)
Dessins (1898), conte pencil on paper, 32 x 24.5 cm, Private Collection
Autoportrait (1898), conte pencil, 33 x 23.5 cm, Private Collection

1899
Tête d'homme à la Greco (1899)
Portrait de Jacint Reventos (1899)
Portrait de Carlos Casagemas (1899)
Menu de Els Quatre Gats (1899)
Le divan (1899)
Fenêtre fermée (1899)
Portrait d'Utrillo (1899)
Portrait de Jaume Sabartés (1899)
Portrait de Oriol Martí (1899)
Caricature (Portrait de Josep Rocarol) (1899)
Lola Picasso, sœur de l'artiste (1899)

Autoportrait (1899)
Allégorie: jeune homme, femme et grotesques (1899)
La chata (1899)
Portrait de Josep Cardona (1899)
Portrait du père de l'artiste (1899)
Femmes traversant une place (1899)
Paysage de Horta d'Ebre (1899)
Homme assis (1899)
Femme nue assise (1899)
Homme (1899)
Buste de Don José (1899)
Enfant assis (1899)
Fille suçant son pouce (1899)
Nu (1899)
Homme nu (1899)
Femme nue assise (1899)
La Muse (1899)
Un vieil homme sale (1899)
Couple assis à une table (1899)
Patio andalou (1899)
Couple (1899)
Le baiser (1899)
Couple andalou (1899)
Don José tenant un parapluie (1899)
Don José avec un pardessus (1899)
Portrait de Don José (1899)
Don José sur le rivage (1899)
Picadors (1899)
Fenêtre fermée (1899)
Portrait de Mercedes (1899)
Intérieur avec vue sur fond enneigé (1899)
Lola devant une fenêtre (1899)
Portrait de Lola (1)  (1899)
Portrait d'homme (1899)
Portrait d'Angel F de Soto (1899)
A l'extérieur de l'aire de danse (1899)
Aumône (1899)
Femme qui prie (1899)
Femme qui prie et enfant (1899)
Scène d'hôpital (Derniers moments) (1899)
Prêtre qui visite un homme mourant (Derniers moments) [Étude] (1899)
Au chevet de l'homme mourant (1899)
Au lit de mort (1899)
Homme mourant et sa famille (1899)
Les derniers moments (1899)
Génies faibles [Étude] (1899)
Portrait de Lola (2) (1899)
Femme assise (1899)
Au chevet de la femme mourante (1899)
Homme lisant et quelques etudes (1899)
Trois nus et main droite (1899)
L'enfant mort-né (1899)
Deux homes (1899)
Portrait de Ramón Reventós (1899)
Portrait de Joan Vidal i Ventosa (1899)
Études (1899)
Portrait de Carles Casagemas (1899)
Portrait (1899)
Études et têtes (1899)
Caricature de Joaquim Mir (1899)
Le sage (1899)
Groupe de femmes qui aide d'autres femmes (1899)
Caricature de violoniste (1899)
Le baiser (1899)
Dame avec pékinois et autres personages (1899)
Affiche 'Carnival 1900 [Étude] (1899)
Gente Nueva [Étude] (1899)
Manola (1899)
Danseuse de flamenco (1899)
Femmes (1899)
Le cloître de la cathédrale (1899)
Têtes d'hommes et femmes [Études]  (1899)
Têtes et figures [Études] (1899)
Têtes et main [Études]  (1899)
Donneur d'aumône [Études] (1899)
Tête de femme [Études] (1899)
Autoportrait [Études] (1899)
Buste de femme et dessins de Carles Casagemas et Joaquim Mir (1899)
Homme à terre (1899)
Quatre femmes qui pleurent [Études] (1899)
Femme assise avec châle (1899)
Portrait d'homme (1899)
Mère et fille (1899)
Picasso et le peintre Casagemas (1899)
Buste de femme [Études] (1899)
Café musical, nain et buste de femme (1899)
Joueurs de cartes, femme et nain (1899)
Dessin pour 'Art [Études] (1899)
A deux doigts de la mort (1899)
A la mort (1899)
Figures dans la rue et études de têtes (1899)
Courses de taureaux (recto); Esquisses (verso) (1899)
Chanteuse (recto); Tête d'espagnole (verso)  (1899)
Les derniers moment(1899)

1900
Le Moulin de la Galette (1900)
Les amants dans la rue (L' étreinte) (1900)
Couple espagnol devant une auberge (1900)
Le peintre Opisso (1900)
Casagemas avec cape et canne (1900)
Portrait de Manolo Hugué (1900)
L'étreinte dans la mansarde (1900)
L'étreinte brutale (1900)
Dans la pièce (La loge) (1900)
Deux femmes assises à une table et deux mains qui écrivent (1900)
Deux femmes (1900)
Deux femmes assises (1900)
Petite fille en habits du Dimanche (1900)
Bonne avec bébé dans ses bras (1900)
Bonne avec deux enfants (1900)
Midinette de Paris (1900)
Dame avec chapeau et écharpe autour du cou (1900)
Prêtre (1900)
Femme assise, visage plein (1900)
Parisienne (1900)
Portrait de Sabatés (1900)
Portrait d'Anglada Camarasa (1900)
French cancan (1900)
Les arènes de Barcelona (1900)
Le matador (1900)
La fin du numéro (1900)
Courses de taureaux (Corrida) (1900)
Casagemas de face et de profil (1900)
Sebastianus III König (Portrait de Sebastià Junyer-Vidal) (1900)
La Musclera (1900)
Arrastre (croquis) (1900)
Intérieur de Els Quatre Gats (1900)
Portrait de Eveli Torent (1900)
Portrait de Creus (1900)
Jeune fille devant une fenêtre ouverte (1900)
Portrait de Daniel Masgoumeri (1900)
Portrait de Jaume Sabartés ('Poeta decadente') (1900)
Portrait d'homme de profil (1900)
Portrait (1900)
Portrait de Carles Casagemas (1900)
Riera de Saint Jean vu d'une fenêtre (1900)
Masque de visage (1900)
Carnaval (1900)
Courses de taureaux (Corrida) (1900)
Taureau tiré par la queue (1900)
La fin de la route (L'ange de la mort) (1900)
Picador et 'Monosario (1900)
Portrait de Ramon Surinach i Senties (1900)
Déjeuner à l'extérieur (1900)
Femme qui rêve de Venise (1900)
Portrait d'auteur (1900)
Homme en manteau espagnol (1900)
Eveli Torent (1900)
Joan B Fonte (1900)
Josep Cardona (1900)
Josep Rocarol (1900)
Poster pour 'Drabas Criollos''' (1900)Auparavant (1900)Maintenant (1900)Picasso et Pallares arrivant à Paris (1900)Autoportrait et études (1900)Une rue de Montmartre (1900)Hommes vaniteux (1900)Germaine (1900)Le peintre Sébastien Junyent (1900)Nogueras Oller et personnages dans Els Quatre Gats (1900)La sortie de l'exposition universelle, Paris (1900)Scène tauromachique (1900)Portrait de Joaquim Mir (1900)Pere Romeu (1900)Els Quatre Gats' menu [Étude] (1900)Affiche 'Caja de Previsión y Socorro [Étude] (1900)Affiche 'El Liberal [Étude] (1900)Dessin pour le journal 'Joventut' (1900)Etre ou ne pas être (1900)Corrida [Études] (1900)Enterrement rural (1900)Personnages sur une place bordée d'arbres (1900)Lettre de Casagemas et Picasso à Cinto Reventós (1900)Cochers (1900)Femmes au café (1900)Danseuse et femmes (1900)Baraque foraine (1900)Deux personages (1900)Femme en rouge (1900)Dans l'arène (1900)El clam de les verges (1900)Frommage a la creme! (1900)A la belle tomate!'' (1900)

References
https://web.archive.org/web/20100129090305/http://picasso.tamu.edu/

1889-1900
Picasso 1889-1900